32 Malasana Street is a 2020 Spanish supernatural horror film directed by Albert Pintó. The cast features Begoña Vargas, Bea Segura, Iván Marcos, Sergio Castellanos and Javier Botet, among others.

Plot 
The fiction is set in 1976. A family from the countryside (the Olmedo family formed by Manolo, Candela, their three children and the grandfather Fermín) moves to the neighborhood of Malasaña in Madrid. Upon their arrival to their new home, they find out that the will have to endure living with a "strange presence".

Cast

Production 

The film was produced by Mr. Fields and Friends, Atresmedia Cine, Warner Bros. Entertainment España, Malasaña Movie AIE and 4 CATS Pictures.

A prime shooting location was a building in Calle de San Bernardino 3, Madrid (32 Malasaña Street does not exist, Calle de Malasaña actually ends at 30), which has also hosted part of the filmings of Witching & Bitching, May God Save Us and Don't Blame the Karma for Being an Idiot, among others.

Shooting had already wrapped in September 2019.

Release 
Distributed by Warner Bros., the film was theatrically released in Spain on 17 January 2020.

Reception 
Eulàlia Iglesias of El Confidencial gave the film 2 out of 5 stars. She wrote than the film "does not delve into its metaphorical potential" and it ends up relying too much on "cheap scares". She also considered that the ending goes off-rail and that Concha Velasco does not seem to believe in the role she is playing.

Pablo Vázquez of Fotogramas gave it 3 out of 5 stars, considering the film to be "an honest collection of scares", although he missed some dark humour in the film.

Among genre tropes and cliches galore, Javier Ocaña of El País wrote that some distinctive features can be discerned (related to the production design, costumes and some social details making nods to the era the film is set in). He deemed the last half hour to be "great".

Raquel Hernández Luján of HobbyConsolas gave it 68 out of 100 points ("acceptable"), praising the cast, the production design and sound production, whilst negatively assessing the "ridiculous" ending, the abuse of jumpscares and the plot's lack of internal logic.

See also 
 List of Spanish films of 2020

References

External links 
 32 Malasana Street at ICAA's Catálogo de Cinespañol

2020 films
2020 horror films
Films set in Madrid
Films set in 1976
Films shot in Madrid
Spanish haunted house films
2020s supernatural horror films
2020s Spanish-language films
Spanish supernatural horror films
Films about internal migration
Atresmedia Cine films
2020s Spanish films
Bambú Producciones films